Heminoemacheilus is a small genus of stone loaches endemic to Guangxi in China and only living in caves.

Species
There are currently 3 recognized species in this genus:

 Heminoemacheilus hyalinus J. H. Lan, J. X. Yang & Y. R. Chen, 1996
 Heminoemacheilus parvus Y. Zhu & D. G. Zhu, 2015
 Heminoemacheilus zhengbaoshani S. Q. Zhu & W. X. Cao, 1987

References

Cave fish
Nemacheilidae
Fish of Asia